Tenancy deposit scheme may refer to:

 Tenancy deposit scheme (England and Wales)
 Tenancy deposit schemes (Scotland)
 Tenancy deposit scheme (Northern Ireland)

See also
 Damage deposit